Sokolov (masculine) or Sokolova (feminine) is one of the top ten most common Russian family names and has Cossack roots.
The name derives from the Russian word "" (sokol, meaning "falcon"). It may appear in Germanized form as Sokoloff or Sokolow.

Geographical distribution
As of 2014, of all known bearers of the surname Sokolov, the following countries had, as residents, the following shares of the international population of persons bearing the name:

Within Russia, the frequency was higher than the population-proportionate contribution to the national 76.3% share, in each of the following constituents of the Russian Federation:

Kostroma Oblast (1 in 179)
Vologda Oblast (1 in 251)
 Tver Oblast (1 in 260)
Ivanovo Oblast (1 in 269)
Yaroslavl Oblast (1 in 270)
 Mari El (1 in 303)
 Altai Republic (1 in 368)
 Kurgan Oblast (1 in 397)
Vladimir Oblast (1 in 433)
 Nizhny Novgorod Oblast (1 in 494)
 Leningrad Oblast (1 in 494)
Saint Petersburg (1 in 526)
 Moscow Oblast (1 in 559)
 Murmansk Oblast (1 in 597)
 Irkutsk Oblast (1 in 626)
 Tula Oblast (1 in 631)
 Moscow (1 in 649)
 Saratov Oblast (1 in 658)
 Oryol Oblast (1 in 661)
 Volgograd Oblast (1 in 662)
 Sakhalin Oblast (1 in 665)
 Republic of Karelia (1 in 672)
 Arkhangelsk Oblast (1 in 683)
 Khakassia (1 in 703)
 Sverdlovsk Oblast (1 in 735)
 Chelyabinsk Oblast (1 in 740)
 Kaluga Oblast (1 in 746)
 Kaliningrad Oblast (1 in 747)
 Smolensk Oblast (1 in 758)

People
 A–D given names
 Aleksandr Sokolov (disambiguation), several people
 Andrei Sokolov (born 1963), French, ex-Russian chess player
Andrei Sokolov (born 1972), Latvian chess player
 Arseny Sokolov (1910–1986), Russian physicist, coauthor of Sokolov–Ternov effect
 Boris Sokolov (disambiguation), several people
 Denis Viktorovich Sokolov (born 1983), Russian rifle shooter
 Denis Yurevich Sokolov (born 1977), Russian ice hockey defenceman
 Dmitri Sokolov (disambiguation), several people
 E–G given names
Elena Sokolova (born 1980), Russian figure skater
Eugene Sokolov (1920–2008), Russian neuroscientist
 Eva Sokolova (born 1961), Russian hurdler
 Evgenia Sokolova (1850–1925), Russian dancer and educator
Evgeny Sokolov (born 1984) Russian cyclist
Fedor Sokolov (born 1984), Israeli pair skater
Fred Sokolow (born 1945), American multi-instrumentalist.
Georgi Sokolov (1942–2002), Bulgarian footballer
 Grigory Sokolov (born 1950), Russian pianist
 I given names
Igor Sokolov (born 1958), Soviet sport shooter and Olympic champion
 Ivan Sokolov (born 1968), Yugoslav-born Dutch chess player
 Ivan Sokolov (born 1960), Russian composer
 Ivan Glebovich Sokolov (born 1960), Russian-born pianist and composer
 K–L given names
 Lale Sokolov (1916–2006), the tattooist of Auschwitz
 Larisa Sokolova, Russian musicologist
 Lydia Sokolova (1896–1974), English ballerina
 Lyubov Sokolova (volleyball) (born 1977), Russian volleyball player
 Lyubov Sokolova (1921–2001), Soviet and Russian actress
 Konstantin Sokolov (born 1991), Russian ice hockey player
 M–O given names
Maksim Sokolov (born 1968), Russian economist and former Minister of Transport of Russia
Marina Sokolova (born 1969), Russian-born German chess player
Maxim Sokolov (born 1972), Russian ice hockey goaltender
Mikhail Sokolov (1885–1947), Russian painter, graphic artist and illustrator
Nahum Sokolow (1859–1936), Jewish Hebrew-language writer and Zionist leader
Natalia Sokolova (model) (born 1976), Russian model and actress
Nikolay Sokolov (disambiguation), several people
Oleg Sokolov, Russian historian and member of the Odessa Group
  P–T given names
 Pavel Sokolov (disambiguation), several people
 Pyotr Sokolov (disambiguation), several people
 Raymond Sokolov (born 1941), American culinary journalist
 Sasha Sokolov (born 1943), Russian writer
 Saška Sokolov, Serbian athlete
 Sergei Sokolov (disambiguation), several people
 Stanislav Sokolov (born 1947), Russian animator
 Tsvetan Sokolov (born 1989), Bulgarian volley player
  V given names
Valeriy Sokolov (born 1986), Ukrainian violinist
Vasili Sokolov (1874–1959), Russian revolutionary and party journalist
Victor Sokolov (1947–2006), Russian-American dissident journalist and a priest
Victor Sokolov  Alias name of espionage agent Anatoly Gurevich
Viktor Sokolov (disambiguation), several people
Vladimir Sokolov (disambiguation), several people
Vladislav Sokolov (1908–1993), Soviet choir conductor and composer, People's Artist of the USSR
 Y given names
 Yefrem Sokolov (1926–2022), former leader of the Byelorussian SSR
 Yegor Sokolov (1750–1824), Russian architect
 Yevgeny Sokolov (born 1931), Lithuanian middle-distance runner
 Yevgeny Gavrilovich Sokolov (1880–1949), Russian artist
 Yordan Sokolov (1933–2016), Bulgarian jurist and former Minister of Interior of Bulgaria
 Yurii Dmitrievich Sokolov (1896–1971), Russian mathematician

Fictional characters
 Sokolov, former Russian Spetsnaz in Neal Stephenson's novel Reamde
 Dr.Sokolov, a character in Ivan Vazov's novel Under the Yoke
 Andrey Sokolov, the main character of the Russian writer Mikhail Sholokhov's short story The Fate of Man
 Game characters:
 Nikolai Stepanovich Sokolov from Metal Gear Solid 3
 Anton Sokolov, Head of the Academy and Royal Physician in the game Dishonored
 Ivan Sokolov, a Russian Greco-Roman wrestler from Buriki One

See also
 Variants of the surname:  
 Sokolow
 Sokoloff
 Similar surnames:
 Sokolić
 Sokol (surname)

Notes

References

Russian-language surnames
Bulgarian-language surnames